Directorate General for National Security may refer to:

 Algerian police
 Sûreté Nationale (Morocco)
 National Security Service (Greece)

See also
Sûreté, the organizational title of a civil police force in many French-speaking countries or regions
Directorate-General for External Security, France
General Directorate for Internal Security, France
General Directorate of General Security, Lebanon
National Directorate of Security, Afghanistan
Directorate of General Security, Iraq
Directorate General for Public Security, Austria
General Directorate of Security (Portugal)
Main Directorate of State Security, USSR